Dmitriy Vladimirovich Kuz'min-Karavaev (1886–1959) was an Old Bolshevik who converted to Catholicism and was subsequently ordained to the priesthood.

Early life 
He was born in St. Petersburg as the son of a Russian Orthodox professor of law. According to Lesley Chamberlain, Kuzmin-Karavayev was also born into the hereditary Russian nobility.

During his legal studies at the University of St. Petersburg, Dmitriy discovered the writings of Vladimir Ilyich Lenin and joined the Bolshevik faction of the Russian Social Democratic Party. After serving a prison term, he openly ceased all anti-Tsarist activity and received a position with the Department of State Properties at the Ministry of Agriculture.

Conversion 
In 1913, Dmitriy purchased a copy of the New Testament from a woman peddling the scriptures on a train from Tambov to St. Petersburg. "I did it," he wrote, "partly out of compassion and partly out of snobbery." When his mother later put his briefcase in order, she was overjoyed to see his latest purchase. To please her, he grudgingly continued to carry the volume with him, but did not begin reading it until after the Bolshevik Revolution in 1917.

He later wrote, "How many moments of consolation do I owe to that New Testament! The image of Christ the Savior, His winning humility, His love of God and men, so profound and impartial, are forever ingrained on my heart."

Dmitriy drifted into the Russian Catholic Church parish overseen by Father Vladimir Abrikosov and was received into the Catholic Church on 5 May 1920. At the time, he was working as an official of the Commissariat for Nationalities under Joseph Stalin. In 1922, he was formally deported by the Soviet regime.

Later life 
In 1927 was ordained a Catholic priest of the Byzantine rite and his ministry was exercised abroad, in Belgium, France and Italy. However, Karavaev was critical of an idea much present in his epoch: the biritualism of certain Russian priests - Latin and Byzantine - which would be an obstacle to uniting Orthodox believers to the Catholic Church. Karavaev died in 1959.

References 

Paul Mailleu, Father SJ. Exarch Leonid Feodorov: Bridgbuilder Between Rome and Moscow. New York: PJ Kenedy and Sons, 1964. S. 129.
Burman, Basil, background, Deacon OSB. Leonid Fedorov: The life and work. Rome, 1966. (Reissue: Lions, 1993).

External links
http://rgcc.narod.ru/his.htm
http://www.krotov.info/lib_sec/04_g/gol/ovanov_06.htm
http://lists.memo.ru/d19/f43.htm
http://www.el-history.ru/node/765
http://www.tez-rus.net/ViewGood32702.html
http://zarubezhje.narod.ru/texts/frrostislav305.htm

1886 births
1959 deaths
Converts to Eastern Catholicism from Eastern Orthodoxy
Former Russian Orthodox Christians
Russian communists
Old Bolsheviks
Russian Eastern Catholics